First Army Division East is a division of the First United States Army. With its new role, the First Army developed two subordinate multi-component headquarters – one division to support the eastern United States and the other to support the western United States. First Army Division West was activated at Fort Carson, Colorado, and later moved to Fort Hood, Texas. First Army Division East was activated on 7 March 2007 at Fort George G. Meade, Maryland, and later moved to Fort Knox, Kentucky.

First Army Division East was established by Department of the Army Permanent Order 156-7 to provide training and readiness oversight and mobilization operations for an area of responsibility spanning 27 states and territories east of the Mississippi River. First Army Division East is responsible for mobilizing, training, readiness oversight and deploying the United States' Reserve and National Guard Soldiers, and selected Sailors and Airmen along with members of multiple interagency and governmental entities.

Subordinate Commands

The division is organized into five brigades located throughout the eastern United States with 52 total battalions.

 4th "Saber" Cavalry Brigade  – Fort Knox, Kentucky. Formerly the 85th Division's 4th Brigade.
 157th "Spartan" Infantry Brigade – Camp Atterbury, Indiana. Formerly the 87th Division's 5th Brigade.
 174th "Patriot" Infantry Brigade – Joint Base Mcguire Dix Lakehurst, New Jersey. Formerly the 78th Division's 2nd Brigade.
 177th "Spear Head" Armored Brigade – Camp Shelby, Mississippi. Formerly the 87th Division's 3rd Brigade.
 188th "Battle Ready" Infantry Brigade – Fort Stewart, Georgia. Formerly the 87th Division's 4th Brigade.

Garrisons
Division East currently operates three mobilization training centers located at Camp Atterbury Joint Maneuver Training Center, Indiana; Camp Shelby Joint Forces Training Center, Mississippi; and Joint Base McGuire–Dix–Lakehurst, New Jersey.

Commanders
MG Jay W. Hood, 2006–2008
BG Blake E. Williams, 2008 (interim)
MG J. Michael Bednarek, 2008–2011
MG Kevin R. Wendel, 2011–2013
MG Jeffrey L. Bailey, 2013–2015
MG Brian J. McKiernan, 2015–2016
MG Todd B. McCaffrey, 2016–2018
MG Terrence J. McKenrick, 2018–2020
MG Mark H. Landes, 2020–2022
BG Brian M. Howay, 2022–present (acting)

External links
Official Website

References 

 United States First Army Division East Headquarters, Public Affairs Office

Divisions of the United States Army
Military units and formations established in 2007